The Campeonato Argentino Abierto de Polo (Spanish for Argentine Open Polo Championship) is an international polo championship at club level, organised every year since 1893 at the Campo Argentino de Polo of Palermo, Buenos Aires.

It was known as the "River Plate Polo Championship" between 1893-1923, and as well as the other two main polo events in Argentina (the Campeonato Abierto de Hurlingham at the Hurlingham Club and the Campeonato Abierto del Tortugas Country Club), the handicap of the teams must be between 28 and 40 goals. It is organized by the Asociación Argentina de Polo (Argentine Polo Association).

In 1975, Coronel Suárez became the first team in history to play in the tournament with a maximum handicap of 40 goals.

The individual record holder with the most Argentine Open Polo Championship victories is Juan C. Harriott Jr. with 20 total championships.

The individual with the greatest length of time between their first victory and their latest victory is Adolfo Cambiaso (1994 to 2020) with 26 years between his first and most recent championships. The individual with the second greatest length of such time is Enrique Alberdi (1934 to 1957) with 23 years between his first championship and his last championship. 

The youngest person to ever win the Argentine Open Polo Championship is Poroto Cambiaso (Adolfo Cambiaso Jr.) who won it in 2022 at age 17 years and 6 days while playing for La Dolfina. The second youngest to ever win the Championship is Benjamin Araya who won it in 1980 at the age of 17 years, four months, and one day while playing for Coronel Suárez. The third youngest person to ever win the Championship was José E. Traill who won it in 1904 at the age of 17 years, four months, and eighteen days while playing for the North Santa Fe team.

The only non-Argentine team to ever win the Championship was the American team in 1932. A group of Americans came to Buenos Aires to play in the 1932 Championship with four of them forming the Meadow Brook team. The Meadow Brook team consisted of Mike Phipps, Winston Guest, Elmer Boeseke Jr., and Billy Post. They beat Santa Paula (Luis Nelson, Martín Reynal, José Reynal, Manuel Andrada) by a score of 8 to 7 in the 1932 final. Notable from that year was that the reserve Americans played for a number of the local Argentine teams. Seymour Knox played for La Pampa, Stewart B. Iglehart and Stephen Sanford played for Santa Inés, Jimmy Mills played for Venado Tuerto, and Pat Roark played for Los Pingüinos.

List of champions
The first championship was held in 1893, being won by Hurlingham. Below is the list of the champions (replacements during the final match are in parenthesis next to player replaced).

Notes:

Multiple championship winners

Notes:

Championship winners with greatest number of unique teammates

Notes:

Titles by club

Gallery

References

External links

 

1893 establishments in Argentina
Polo competitions in Argentina
Recurring sporting events established in 1893
Polo competitions
Sports competitions in Buenos Aires